The Roman Catholic Diocese of Tshilomba is a diocese of the Roman Catholic Church in the Democratic Republic of the Congo.

History
 25 March 2022: the diocese was established from the Diocese of Luiza

See also
Roman Catholicism in the Democratic Republic of the Congo

References

Roman Catholic dioceses in the Democratic Republic of the Congo
Christian organizations established in 2022
Roman Catholic dioceses and prelatures established in the 21st century
Roman Catholic Ecclesiastical Province of Kananga